The 2019–20 OK Liga Femenina was the 12th season of the top-tier league of women's rink hockey in Spain.

After being suspended due to the COVID-19 pandemic, Manlleu were declared champions as only counting the results of the first half of the season.

Format changes
For the first time, the title will be decided by a playoff after the regular season.

The four first qualified teams will join the playoffs, in a best-of-three series format.

Teams

Regular season

League table

Results

Copa de la Reina

The 2020 Copa de la Reina was the 15th edition of the Spanish women's roller hockey cup. The draw was held in A Coruña on 30 January 2020.

For the first time, the tournament would be played together with the men's Copa del Rey. However, it was suspended due to the COVID-19 pandemic.

Bracket

Source: FEP

References

External links
Real Federación Española de Patinaje

OK Liga Femenina seasons
2020 in roller hockey
2019 in roller hockey
2020 in Spanish sport
2019 in Spanish sport